T-Mobile Arena is a multipurpose indoor arena on the Las Vegas Strip in Paradise, Nevada. This is a list of past and upcoming events held at the arena.

Home games of the Vegas Golden Knights, regular tenants of the arena, are listed collectively and not individually.

List

References

Events in Las Vegas
Las Vegas–related lists
Lists of events in the United States
Lists of events by venue